The 2011/12 NTFL season was the 91st season of the Northern Territory Football League (NTFL).

The Tiwi Bombers have won there 1st premiership title while defeating the minor premiers, Nightcliff Tigers in the grand final by 14 points.

Ladder

Grand Final

References

Northern Territory Football League seasons
NTFL